General elections were held in Niue on 30 April 2005. No political parties ran in the poll, with all candidates standing as independents. Around 830 voters participated in the election and 17 of the 20 incumbent MPs retained their seats. Close results in two constituencies meant that winners were drawn from a hat.

Results
All electorate results from http://en.wikinews.org/wiki/World's_smallest_democracy_votes

Common roll

Constituencies

Aftermath
Following the election, Young Vivian was re-elected as Premier by the Assembly, winning 17 of 20 votes (his only opponent, O'Love Jacobsen, won the other three).

In forming his cabinet, Vivian dropped his former finance minister Toke Talagi (one of the MPs to win his seat by draw).

References

Elections in Niue
2005 elections in Oceania
General election
Non-partisan elections
April 2005 events in Oceania